Joakim Olausson (born 14 April 1995) is a Swedish footballer who plays for Ljungskile SK as a midfielder.

Club career 

Olausson joined Atalanta in 2011 from Örgryte IS. He made his Serie A debut on 18 May 2014 in a 2–1 away defeat against Catania.

On 14 November 2019, Ljungskile SK announced the signing of Olausson.

Career statistics

References

External links
 
 
 

1995 births
Living people
Swedish footballers
Serie A players
Allsvenskan players
Ettan Fotboll players
Örgryte IS players
Atalanta B.C. players
BK Häcken players
Qviding FIF players
A.C. Perugia Calcio players
Utsiktens BK players
Ljungskile SK players
Sweden youth international footballers
Swedish expatriate footballers
Expatriate footballers in Italy
Swedish expatriate sportspeople in Italy
Association football midfielders